Shri Balihari Babu a politician from Bahujan Samaj Party is a Member of the Parliament of India representing Uttar Pradesh in the Rajya Sabha, the upper house of the Indian Parliament.

External links
 Profile on Rajya Sabha website

Rajya Sabha members from Uttar Pradesh
Living people
Bahujan Samaj Party politicians from Uttar Pradesh
1950 births
Politicians from Azamgarh district
Place of birth missing (living people)